Alicia Toublanc (born 3 May 1996) is a French handball player who plays for Brest Bretagne Handball and the French national team as a right wing.

She joined the Brest Bretagne Handball academy in 2014 and signed her first professional contract in 2017.

She suffered from an anterior cruciate ligament (ACL) injury twice in her career, on the same knee, in 2015 and 2017.

Achievements

Club

International 
 EHF Champions League
 Finalist: 2021 (with Brest Bretagne Handball)

Domestic

 French league:
 Winner : 2021 (with Brest Bretagne Handball)
 Tied 1st: 2020 (with Brest Bretagne Handball)
 Runner up: 2017, 2018 and 2022 (with Brest Bretagne Handball)

 French Cup (Coupe de France):
 Winner : 2016, 2018 and 2021 (with Brest Bretagne Handball)
 Runner up: 2019 (with Brest Bretagne Handball)

 French 2nd division league (Division 2 Féminine):
 Winner : 2016 (with Brest Bretagne Handball)

National team 

 World Championship:
 2021: 

 European Championship
 2022: 4th

Individual awards 

 French league:
 Player of the Month: May 2022
 7 Majeur de la semaine (Best 7 Players of the week): Day 7 of 2019/20; Day 2&11 of 2020/21; Day 24 of 2021/22; Day 4&11 of 2022/23
 EHF Champions League:
 2022-23 Season:
 Best 7 Players of the Round - Best Right Wing: R7, R8

References

External links

1996 births
Living people
French female handball players